Orange County Airport is the original name of the John Wayne Airport in Santa Ana, Orange County, California

Orange County Airport may also refer to:

 Orange County Airport (New York), a general aviation airport in Montgomery, Orange County, New York
 Orange County Airport (Texas), a general aviation airport in Orange, Orange County, Texas
 Orange County Airport (Virginia), a general aviation airport in Orange, Orange County, Virginia